Atheta esuriens is a species of rove beetle first found in Turkey.

External links 
 rove beetles of the world on the UF / IFAS Featured Creatures Web site

References

Aleocharinae
Beetles described in 2010